Au is a town in the Bregenz Forest in Vorarlberg (Austria).

Geography
The town belongs to the Bregenz Forest, is part of the district of Bregenz, and lies in the Upper Bregenz Forst.

40 percent of its 45 km² area is covered with forest, 34.4% of the area is used as alpine pasture (Almwirtschaft) and for other forms of alpine agriculture.

The town itself is unlike most others in the area, as it has no real center. Au is an example of a "scattered village" (German: Streudorf). It consists of several districts: Am Stein, Argenau, Argenstein, Argenzipfel, Jaghausen, Kreuzgasse, Lebernau, Lugen, Lisse, Rehmen, Schrecken, and Wieden.

The town hall is located in Argenau, but the parish church is located in Jaghausen. The district of Rehmen also has its own church.

The river Bregenzer Ach, the largest river in the region, flows through Au and divides it into two parts: The one part is called Schattseite (meaning “shady side”), and consists of the districts of Argenau, Argenzipfel and Wieden; the other part is called Sonnseite (meaning “sunny side”) and consists (mainly) of Rehmen and Schrecken. Alongside the river runs the L200 road, which is the main route through the Bregenz Forest.

History
From 1805 to 1814, Au belonged to the Kingdom of Bavaria, but was then returned to Austria.
Au has belonged to the province of Vorarlberg since the latter’s foundation in 1861.

After World War II, Au was included within the French Occupation Zone of Austria. The occupation lasted from 1945 until the Austrian State Treaty was signed in 1955. 
The occupation force also included many Moroccan soldiers serving in the French army.

Population

Politics 
The town council of Au, called Gemeinderat, consists of 18 members, all of them members of the Auer Liste. The current mayor is Andreas Simma.

Culture 
In 1651, the Auer Zunft (Guild of Au) was founded in Au by Michael Beer. It is an association of builders, sculptors and carpenters. In Au-Schoppernau from 1670 to 1700, more than 90 percent of all male workers were builders. Master builders and craftsmen from the Bregenz Forest in particular, but also from other parts of today's Vorarlberg, played a leading role in the 600 churches and monasteries that were built in the Baroque style in the 17th and 18th centuries. Members of the Guild of Au received 60 percent of the more than 700 major construction contracts awarded to Vorarlbergers.

Many important members of the Guild of Au came from the architect families Beer, Moosbrugger and Thumb.

In 2021, the Museum of Baroque Master Builders was opened in Au. It is dedicated to the works of the Guild of Au.

Economics and infrastructure

A main economic factor in Au is tourism. Many private households rent out rooms or flats. There are several hotels, many of them providing special venues or events, e.g. wellness, sports,
and motorbiking. Agriculture was formerly the main income source for the village, until the rise of tourism.

Transportation
Au is situated on the L200, the Bregenzerwald Bundesstraße. Here it connects to the L193, the Faschina Bundesstraße, which is the main route to the skiing resort of Damüls.
Public transportion consists of the Postbus Line 40, running from Dornbirn to Schoppernau. In winter there is also a free bus service running through the town for skiers and locals.

Education
There is a kindergarten, a Volksschule (primary school), and a Hauptschule (lower secondary school), all located in a building in the district Schrecken.
The secondary school also serves the towns of Schnepfau, Schoppernau, Damüls and Schröcken.

Personalities
Kaspar Moosbrugger (Vorarlberg School; * May 16, 1656, in Au; † August 26, 1723, in Einsiedeln)
 Franz Beer (master builder and co-founder of Vorarlberg School; * April 1, 1660, in Au (Vorarlberg); † January 21, 1726, in Bezau)
 Jan Zwischenbrugger (professional footballer; * June 16, 1990, in Au, more than 200 league appearances for Rheindorf Altach)

See also
Vorarlberg School

References

External links
https://www.au-schoppernau.at/de

Bregenz Forest Mountains
Cities and towns in Bregenz District